There are two tournaments in men's professional golf called the Mercedes-Benz Championship.

Mercedes-Benz Championship (European Tour), the name from 2007 of a European Tour event previously known as the German Masters
Hyundai Tournament of Champions, the opening event of the PGA Tour season, known as the Mercedes-Benz Championship from 2007 to 2009